Kjell Oddvar Karlsen (29 July 1931 – 5 May 2020) was a Norwegian band leader, composer, arranger, jazz pianist and organist, and a Nestor of Norwegian music and show business, with a career spanning more than 60 years. He was the father of the singer Webe Karlsen.

Career
Karlsen was born in Sarpsborg. Inspired by the Nat King Cole jazz ensembles from the time of World War II, he started his own orchestra at the age of 16 in 1947, The Syncopators Band, in Sarpsborg, and he soon became a central figure in the local jazz scene. In the period 1953–59, he had a series of bands with local musicians, many to be influential on the Norwegian and some on the World jazz scenes, like the jazz singer Karin Krog (1955–56), the saxophone players Totti Bergh (1955–59), Bjørn Johansen (1956–58) and Harald Bergersen (1959), and drummer Ole Jacob Hansen (1959), most of whom later would play central roles in the renowned Kjell Karlsens Big Band that he started together with saxophone player Mikkel Flagstad (1959–64). In addition to the ones listed above, K.K.B.B. featured musicians like trombonist Frode Thingnæs, bassist Erik Amundsen and the singers Grynet Molvig, Laila Dalseth, Odd Børre and Kirsti Sparboe among others. Karlsen also worked as a pianist and was an accompanist for a number of Norwegian and International Jazz soloists. He attended the first International Jazz Festival in Molde 1961.

When he had to close down the K.K.B.B. in 1964, he got more into popular music, even though he put together big bands for occasions, and was the orchestra leader for the recording Jazzway to Norway (1984), as directed by NOPA for the presentation of New Norwegian Big Band Compositions. He also started the Kjell Karlsens Orchestra and because of the great demand he started an additional band Bent Sølves in 1967. Karlsen was early engaged in the NRK and led a program called Swingtime. K.K.O. was a lesser orchestra and was the regular Studio Orchestra in the final of the Norwegian Melodi Grand Prix in 1966, 1967 and 1968. Karlsen also was the composer of the song of the popular figure Titten Tei (1972), a wooden dummy from the Norwegian children's television given life by Birgit Strøm. Another well known composition from NRK is the song of Ante (1974) a series about a Sami boy made for slightly older children. He has also given compositions to the Norwegian Melodi Grand Prix like Kom sol, kom regn (1962) and Lena (1969), and has written the music to three Norwegian feature films, Sønner av Norge kjøper bil (1962), Freske fraspark (1963) and Marenco (1964).

Karlsen founded the record label Viking Music in 1962, and among the signed bands and artists were The Beatniks, Rannie Rommen, Lorne Lesley and Jack Dailey. Kjell Karlsen's Big Band and Finn Eriksen also made recordings for the label. Karlsen was the initiator and opened the concert series Jazzakademiet in Oslo Konserthus (1997). Karlsen and a new generation of Norwegian musicians with Even Skatrud Andersen as one, gathered a new edition of the Kjell Karlsen Big Band and made the renowned arrangements to Edvard Grieg in jazz mood for the 10th anniversary of the Jazzakademiet in 2007, recorded in 2008.

In the summer of 2011, Karlsen was 80 years old and was celebrated with an anniversary gala at Oslo Konserthus where a large number of artist friends and partners lined up with a Big Band and choir for a musical event constituting a party out of the ordinary.

Karlsen died on May 5, 2020.

Composer to the Melodi Grand Prix

Releases
I selskap med K. K. Orkester vol 1, 3 and 3 (1968–71).
K. K. Big Band Bonanza (Tylden, 2001)
Edvard Grieg in jazz mood (Universal Music, 2009).  Vokalbesetning:  Pitsj, Heidi Ruud Ellingsen, Kåre Conradi, Torun Eriksen, Carsten Loly and Bjørn Johan Muri.

Awards
Gammleng-prisen 1995 in the class Veterans.

Filmography (as composer)
1962: Sønner av Norge kjøper bil
1963: Freske fraspark
1964: Marenco
1974: Ante (TV series)

References

External links

Biography Kjell Karlsen - Store Norske Leksikon
Biografi and images from the Norwegian Music Information
 

20th-century Norwegian pianists
21st-century Norwegian pianists
Norwegian jazz pianists
Norwegian composers
Norwegian male composers
Bandleaders
Musicians from Sarpsborg
1931 births
2020 deaths
Norwegian male pianists
20th-century Norwegian male musicians
21st-century Norwegian male musicians
Male jazz musicians